The Arauco Peninsula (Spanish: península de Arauco), is a peninsula in Southern Chile located in the homonymous Arauco Province. It projects northwest into the Pacific Ocean. The peninsula is located west of Cordillera de Nahuelbuta. Geologically it is a forearc high.

See also
Arauco Basin
Ranquil Formation

References

Peninsulas of Chile
Landforms of Biobío Region
Coasts of Biobío Region